Chambhar is caste from Indian state of Maharashtra, and Northern Karnataka. Their traditional occupation was  leather work. Historically subject to untouchability, they were traditionally outside the Hindu ritual ranking system of castes known as varna. Castes with similar traditional occupation are found throughout the Indian subcontinent such as Chamar in Northern india, and Mochi in Gujarat.

History 
Chambhars have made many contributions in religious and reform movements by Santbai.

Maratha era 
Chambhars as the cobbler of the village formed one of the twelve hereditary village servants under the Bara Balutedar system of Maharashtra. .  Historically, Chambhars are related to leather work and are landless but gradually their women engaged in midwifery and agricultural labour.

Culture and society 
Chambhars in Maharashtra follow Hinduism. They also revere Bhakti Sant Rohidas.

Social status 
Chambhars enjoyed better position unlike their counterparts of other states, e.g – Chamars of North India, Madigas of Andhra Pradesh, etc. Even they were part of mainstream business of local markets and economically well-off.

Currently, Chambhars are in different fields and after the introduction of the reservation policy in India it helped a lot of them to improve their lifestyle.

They fall under Scheduled Caste category in the states of Maharashtra and Karnataka.

Notables 
 Milind Kamble, founder of the Dalit Indian Chamber of Commerce and Industry and chairman of Fortune Constructions (Mumbai)
 Vithal Palwankar, cricketer who captained an Indian team at Bombay Quadragular.
 Palwankar Baloo, cricketer of India and leader of Hindu Mahasabha.
 Palwankar Ganpat, Indian cricket player
 Palwankar Shivram, Indian cricket player of Hindu Gymkhana.
 Ramanand Dass, was a leader of the Dera Sach Khand, and a follower of Guru Ravidas.
 Ashok Khade, Chairman of DAS Offshore (Mumbai), one of the biggest oil platform makers of India

See also 
Guru Ravidass
Utpala dynasty
Ravidasia
Adi Jambava
Ad-Dharmi
Chamar
Jatav
Ramdasia
Shri Khuralgarh Sahib
Dera Sach Khand
Shri Guru Ravidass Janam Asthan
Shri Guru Ravidas Gurughar
List of Ravidassia people

References 

Indian castes
Scheduled Castes of Maharashtra